De la Cabeza is the sixth album by the Argentine Rock band Bersuit Vergarabat, released in 2002. It is the only live album of the band, recorded at the Obras Sanitarias Stadium in Buenos Aires, and at the Haedo's ShowCenter. Features the best tracks of the band until that time. The track "Un Pacto" has never been released in a studio album, and the track "Perro Amor Explota" has only been released in the Amores Perros soundtrack.

Track listing
 "De La Cabeza" – 0:30
 "El Tiempo No Para" (Cazuza-Brandao. Translation: Cordera, Martín) – 5:21
 "Danza De Los Muertos Pobres" (Cordera, Bianco, Martín, Céspedes) – 4:31
 "El Viejo De Arriba" (Subirá)– 4:00
 "Espíritu De Esta Selva" (Cordera, Subirá, Céspedes, Martín, Righi, Verenzuela) – 3:55
 "Vuelos" (Céspedes) – 5:45
 "Mi Caramelo" (Cordera) – 3:29
 "Un Pacto" (Cordera) – 4:55
 "Perro Amor Explota" (Cordera, Martín) – 4:28
 "Tuyu" (Cordera, Bianco, Céspedes, Martín) – 5:21
 "Yo Tomo" (Roghi, Verenzuela, Cordera, Cépedes, Subirá, Martín) – 3:46
 "Señor Cobranza" (De la Vega) – 4:16
 "La Bolsa" (Subirá, Cordera, Martín, Righi, Céspedes, Verenzuela) – 4:24
 "Murguita Del Sur" (Cordera) – 5:03
 "Se Viene" (Cordera, Verenzuela) – 3:40
 "Hociquito De Ratón / Diez Mil (20.000.000 Pesos)" (Cordera / Martín, Bianco) – 9:21

 Diez Mil (20.000.000 Pesos) is a re-edited Bonus Studio Track from the first album of the band, Y Punto.

Personnel 

Néstor Acuña – Accordion
Gaspar Altamirano – Stage Technician
Ananké Asseff – Photography
Tom Baker – Mastering
Baracus – Stage Technician
Salvador Batalla – Photography
Bersuit – Producer, Liner Notes
Adrian Bilbao – Engineer
Javier Casalla – Violin
Pichon Dalpont – Engineer
Pablo Guyot – Producer
Aníbal Kerpel – Personal Assistant
Carlos Martin – Bateria, Group Member
Ariel Prat – Vocals
Oscar Righi – Guitar (Electric), Group Member
Ricardo Rojas y Su Combate Colombiano – Engineer, Mastering
Claudio Romandini – Production Assistant
Alejandro Ros – Graphic Design
Gustavo Santaolalla – Vocals
Daniel Suarez – Vocals, Coros, Group Member
Juan Subirá – Accordion, Keyboards, Coros, Group Member
Jaime Torres – Charango
Alfredo Toth – Producer
Manuel Uriona – Percussion
Alejandro Vázquez – A&R

Releases
 In later releases of the album, the track 4, "El Viejo De Arriba", was changed for the track named "La Petisita Culona", also played in the same concerts, but non included in the first releases of the album.
 Also, In later releases, there's a bonus track named "Diez Mil (20.000.000 Pesos) (Miserable Mix By Plankton Man)"

Charts and certifications

See also
List of best-selling albums in Argentina

References

Live albums recorded in Buenos Aires
Bersuit Vergarabat albums
2002 live albums